Gülüç is a town in Zonguldak province, Turkey, on the shore of the Black Sea.

Gülüç is situated at the mouth of the Gülüç River and is contiguous with the city of Karadeniz Eregli.  Gülüç is adjacent to the Erdemir steel plant.

Towns in Turkey
Populated places in Zonguldak Province